The Prince Edward Fracture Zone (PEFZ) is one of the fracture zones located on the Southwest Indian Ridge in the Indian Ocean between Africa and Antarctica.  The PEFZ is located west of Prince Edward Islands.

The history of seafloor spreading between Africa and Antarctica since the breakup of Gondwana can be traced using magnetic anomaly lineations between the Mozambique Channel and the seafloor of Dronning Maud Land.  Before the 1980s it was assumed that this spreading occurred continuously for 80 million years, from the Cretaceous to present, along the fracture zones flanking the mid-ocean ridge.  In the mid-80s new magnetic lineations discovered near the PEFZ made it clear that a change in the spreading direction occurred 74–56 Ma. As the direction of spreading changed so did the phase.

The largest offset along the Southwest Indian Ridge is located west of the PEFZ and east of the Du Toit Fracture Zone (45°S, 35°E; 53°S, 27°E).

Antarctic Bottom Water flows north through the PEFZ.

References

Notes

Sources

 
 

Fracture zones
Landforms of the Indian Ocean